Uit oude grond (translation: "From the Old Ground") is the third studio album by the Dutch folk/viking metal band Heidevolk, which was released on March 26, 2010.

Track listing

Personnel
 Mark Bockting - vocals
 Jesse Vuerbaert - vocals
 Joost Westdijk - drums
 Rowan Middelwijk - bass
 Sebas Bloeddorst - guitars, mandolin, bullhorn, Jew's harp
 Reamon Bloem - guitars
 Joris Boghtdrincker - vocals

Guest musicians
 Dick Kemper - vocals
 Elianne Anemaat - cello
 Irma Vedelaer - violin, viola
 Nico Neusbeul - vocals

Production
 Dick Kemper - mixing

References

2010 albums
Heidevolk albums
Napalm Records albums